Sir William Bock Ayling (30 August 1867 – 25 September 1946) was a British civil servant and judge who served on the bench of the Madras High Court from 1912 to 1924.

Early life 

Ayling was born at Weymouth in Dorset on 30 August 1867 to Frederick William and Maria Ayling; his father was described as a lodging house keeper in 1871. Ayling was educated at Weymouth College and Magdalene College. He joined the Indian civil service in 1886 and arrived in India on 30 January 1889 on completion of his training.

Career 

Ayling served as Assistant Collector and magistrate and was appointed as Sub-Collector in January 1900. From 1903 he served as a district and sessions judge and in 1912.  He served as the Principal District Judge of Salem District of Madras Presidency during March 1907 to February 1908, and from January 1909 to June 1910.  (Refer Salem District E-court). Ayling was appointed judge of the Madras High Court and served till 1924. He also officiated as Chief Justice for a short period in 1921.

As Chief Justice, Ayling headed the three-member committee appointed to investigate the 1921 Buckingham and Carnatic Mills Strike. Apart from Ayling, the committee consisted of two Indians - a Brahmin and a non-Brahmin. The committee submitted its report in a short while blaming the striking workers for indulging in violence against Dalits.

Death 

Ayling died at his house at Berkhamstead on 25 September 1946. He was seventy nine at the time of his death.

Ayling married Emma Annie Graham in 1901. Emma died in 1912. Ayling was made a Knight Bachelor in 1915.

References 

1867 births
1946 deaths
Knights Bachelor
Alumni of Magdalene College, Cambridge
Chief Justices of the Madras High Court
People educated at Weymouth College (public school)
British India judges